Alexis Amber Gray-Lawson (born April 21, 1987) is a basketball player who most recently played for the Phoenix Mercury of the Women's National Basketball Association. She was the 2010 recipient of the Frances Pomeroy Naismith award, which is presented by the WBCA annually to 'the nation's most outstanding NCAA Division I female basketball player who stands 5'8" tall or under".

Childhood
Gray-Lawson was born April 21, 1987, in Oakland, California.  Her parents are Orlando Gray and Roslyn Lawson.  She has eight siblings, Kameron, Kenya, Layce, Violet, Vanessa, Kevin, William, and Kenny. Jason Kidd is a close family friend, she is related to Willie McGee who played for the St. Louis Cardinals.

High school career
Gray-Lawson went to Oakland Tech for her entire high school career, and earned the 2005 second team Parade All-American and All-State Honors as she and California teammate Devanei Hampton led Oakland Tech to their second state title.  She was ranked 17th nationally by the Blue Star Index and 25th by Mike White's All-Star Girls Report.  She was listed as 5th by the NorCal Scouting Report.  She was MVP of the 2004 California state Championships, named to the 2005 McDonald's All-American game, and the Senior Slam All-Star game in 2005. Oakland Tech retired her jersey, as they lost only one home game while she was there.  She also played softball, earning three all-city honors and league MVP as a senior with the softball team.  She competed on the volleyball team as a freshman as well.

College career
Gray-Lawson spent a total of five years at the University of California, Berkeley. During her sophomore year she would play only nine games before suffering a season-ending injury.  She would be red-shirted for the remainder of her sophomore season.  Gray-Lawson was on the All-Pac-10 First Team in 2009 and 2010, the Pac-10 All-Defensive team in 2010, All-Pac-10 Second Team in 2008, Pac-10 All-Freshmen Team in 2006, All-Pac-10 Honorable Mention in 2006, and was the Pac-10 Freshman of the Year in 2006. She was named to the Women's Basketball News Service All-Freshman Team in 2006, Associated Press All-American Honorable Mention in 2009, and was a WNIT Champion in 2010. She was first on the California Golden Bears career list for three-pointers made with a total of 148, and named one of the top five 2-guards in the nation by ESPN.com in a 2008-2009 women's basketball preseason ranking.

California statistics
Source

USA Basketball

Gray-Lawson was named a member of the team representing the U.S. at the 2009 World University Games held in Belgrade, Serbia. The team won all seven games to earn the gold medal. Gray-Lawson averaged 7.9 points per game and 4.3 rebounds per game.

WNBA career
Gray-Lawson was selected the third round of the 2010 WNBA Draft (30th overall) by the Washington Mystics. She was cut prior to the season. The Phoenix Mercury signed Gray-Lawson to a training camp contract and she would make the team. She played in 27 games with the Mercury, scoring her first WNBA career points on June 24, 2011, in Atlanta.

International career
Gray-Lawson went to play for Samsun Basketbol in the Turkish Women's League during the 2010-2011 off-season after she was waived by the Washington Mystics.  For her second year overseas, following her rookie season with the WNBA she is playing in Israel with H. R. Le-Zion for 2011-2012.

Coaching career
In 2015 named the Como Park Girls basketball head coach. In 2020 names the Saint Joseph Notre Dame High School girls head varsity coach

References

External links

Cal Golden Bears bio

1987 births
Living people
American expatriate basketball people in Israel
American expatriate basketball people in Turkey
American women's basketball players
Basketball players from Oakland, California
California Golden Bears women's basketball players
Parade High School All-Americans (girls' basketball)
Phoenix Mercury players
Universiade medalists in basketball
Universiade gold medalists for the United States
Guards (basketball)
Medalists at the 2009 Summer Universiade
21st-century American women
United States women's national basketball team players